"Chicanery" is the fifth episode of the third season of the AMC television series Better Call Saul, the spinoff series of Breaking Bad. The episode aired on May 8, 2017 on AMC in the United States. Outside of the United States, the episode premiered on streaming service Netflix in several countries.

Plot

Opening
In a flashback to 2001, Jimmy McGill aids Chuck McGill as he attempts to reconcile with Rebecca Bois during dinner at Chuck's house. Rebecca does not know Chuck believes he suffers from EHS and answers a call on her cellular phone, which causes Chuck to panic and knock the phone out of her hands.

Main story
In 2003, Jimmy asks Dr. Caldera if he knows "someone with a light touch" who is willing to do a job. After a successful hearing before the banking board, Kim Wexler informs Paige Novick and Kevin Wachtell of Chuck's allegations that Jimmy tampered with Mesa Verde documents, which they dismiss as Chuck's anger at making a mistake.

The bar association's attorney intends to use Jimmy's taped confession, and Kim knows Chuck will testify to its authenticity, allowing Kim and Jimmy to cross-examine Chuck and bring up his EHS. She suggests in her opening that the real story is not Jimmy's supposed crimes, but the feud between Jimmy and Chuck.

The hearing room is arranged to accommodate Chuck's EHS and Howard Hamlin testifies that Chuck did not want to hire Jimmy as an attorney at HHM, supposedly to avoid the appearance of nepotism. Kim points out that HHM hired Howard even though he was the founding partner's son. Jimmy's confession is played for the committee.

Chuck arrives to testify and bumps into Huell Babineaux. To Chuck's surprise, Jimmy arrives with Rebecca. She explains that Jimmy contacted her out of concern for Chuck's well-being, but Chuck tells her Jimmy called her as a psychological tactic to disrupt Chuck's testimony.

During cross-examination, Jimmy raises Chuck's EHS and asks him to identify the closest source of electricity. Chuck guesses Jimmy is attempting a trick and asks if Jimmy has something in his pocket. Jimmy reveals his cell phone and Chuck correctly guesses Jimmy has removed the battery. Jimmy then asks Chuck to reach into his own pocket and Chuck pulls out the phone battery. Jimmy reveals Huell planted the battery on Chuck when they bumped into each other. Though Chuck has carried it for nearly two hours, he has not been affected by his supposed EHS. When the bar association's attorney argues that Chuck's apparent mental illness is irrelevant in the context of the charges against Jimmy, Chuck becomes offended and rants angrily about Jimmy's dishonest behavior. He stops mid-sentence, realizing his tirade has shocked everyone into silence.

Production
The episode is directed by Daniel Sackheim, a first-time director on the show, and written by Gordon Smith, who previously wrote the season 2 episode "Inflatable".

This episode is the first time Jonathan Banks, who had appeared in every episode in the series up to that point, did not make an appearance as Mike. Lavell Crawford reprises his role as Huell Babineaux from Breaking Bad after last appearing in the season 5 episode "To'hajiilee".

Reception

Ratings
Upon airing, the episode received 1.76 million American viewers, and an 18–49 rating of 0.7. With Live+7 viewing factored in, the episode had an overall audience of 4.16 million viewers, and a 1.6 18–49 rating.

Critical reception

The episode received universal acclaim from critics, with many considering it to be one of the best of the series. Terri Schwartz of IGN awarded the episode 10 out of 10, describing it as "the best episode of Better Call Saul to date". It holds a 100% on Rotten Tomatoes with an average of 9.5/10 based on 14 reviews. The site consensus reads: "The war between Jimmy and Chuck comes to an unprecedented climax in the heartbreaking, sober, and defining 'Chicanery', an episode that clearly cements Better Call Saul as essential television."

TVLine named Michael McKean the "Performer of the Week" for his performance in this episode, writing it was the "finest showcase yet for his fascinatingly layered performance as Jimmy's brother Chuck McGill." Donna Bowman of The A.V. Club, who gave the episode an "A" rating, praised the courtroom scene, saying "it isn't just to give us the satisfaction of a courtroom drama, the neat ending where the truth comes out. The brilliance of this structure is to give us a slow-motion view of the heavens falling, an outcome methodically pursued by Kim and Jimmy, which nevertheless seems to give them no satisfaction."

At the 69th Primetime Emmy Awards, Skip Macdonald was nominated for Outstanding Single-Camera Picture Editing for a Drama Series, and Gordon Smith was nominated for Outstanding Writing for a Drama Series for this episode, his second for the series. Smith was awarded the Writers Guild of America Award for Episodic Drama. Many critics were disappointed when McKean, who was said to have given "one of the best performances by anyone in TV all year", failed to secure an Emmy nomination while his co-star Jonathan Banks did.

Analysis
The episode's final scene is an homage to the climactic courtroom scene in The Caine Mutiny, in which a suspicious, authoritarian, by-the-book Navy captain cracks under cross-examination. Uproxx noted that even the facial expressions of "Chicanery's" three committee members mirror those of three judges in Caine. (The film—which Vince Gilligan counts among his favorites—is also referenced in the Breaking Bad episode "Madrigal", in which Mike can be seen watching it.)

In popular culture
Chuck's monologue at the end has been subject to many Internet memes.
On March 24, 2020, a Subreddit named r/okbuddychicanery (itself a parody of the popular r/okbuddyretard subreddit) was created. It features satirical and ironic memes and shitposts around Better Call Saul and Breaking Bad, many of which are parodies of Chuck's monologue. As of October 2022 it has over 200,000 members.

References

External links
 "Chicanery" at AMC
 

Better Call Saul (season 3) episodes
Television episodes directed by Daniel Sackheim
Internet memes introduced in 2017